The Asociación Feminista Filipina (Philippine Feminist Association), was a Filipino women's organization, founded in 1904. It was the first women's organization in the Philippines. 

It was founded by Concepcion Felix Rodriguez. It worked for women's political equality in municipal- and provincial level electorates and committees. It was also active within social welfare and improvement in the conditions of prisons, schools and work force.

References

Organizations established in 1904
1904 establishments
Women's rights organizations
Women's organizations based in the Philippines
1904 in the Philippines
Feminism in the Philippines
History of women in the Philippines